Robin Francis Eliot (7 March 1942 – 10 February 2017) was an English first-class cricketer and racing horse owner.

Eliot was born at Gloucester in March 1942. He was educated at Radley College, before going up to Lincoln College, Oxford. While studying at Oxford he made two appearances in first-class cricket in 1961. The first came for Oxford University against Leicestershire at Oxford, while the second came for L. C. Stevens' XI against Cambridge University at Eastbourne. After graduating from Oxford, he joined Lloyd's of London as an aviation underwriter, before running his own company from 1977–94. He had a keen interest in horse racing, owning National Hunt horses, including Deep Sensation which won the Queen Mother Champion Chase in 1993. He died in February 2017.

References

External links

1942 births
2017 deaths
People from Gloucester
People educated at Radley College
Alumni of Lincoln College, Oxford
English cricketers
Oxford University cricketers
L. C. Stevens' XI cricketers
British racehorse owners and breeders
20th-century English businesspeople